Tommy Robredo was the defending champion but withdrew due to leg injury.

First-seeded Juan Mónaco beat seventh-seeded Carlos Berlocq 6–3, 6–7(1–7), 6–1 to take the 2012 title.

Seeds
The top four seeds received a bye into the second round.

Draw

Finals

Top half

Bottom half

Qualifying

Seeds

Qualifiers

Qualifying draw

First qualifier

Second qualifier

Third qualifier

Fourth qualifier

References 
Main Draw
Qualifying Draw

2012 ATP World Tour
Articles containing video clips